Harry Smith (born March 14, 1907; died 1983) was a former U.S. soccer full back. Smith earned two caps with the U.S. national team in 1928.  The first came at the 1928 Summer Olympics when the U.S. lost to Argentina 11-2.  Following this loss, the U.S. tied Poland, 3-3, on June 10, 1928.  At the time, he played for Lighthouse F.C.

References

Lighthouse Boys Club players
1983 deaths
Footballers at the 1928 Summer Olympics
Olympic soccer players of the United States
United States men's international soccer players
1907 births
Association football defenders
American soccer players
People from Ocean City, New Jersey
Sportspeople from Cape May County, New Jersey
Soccer players from New Jersey